Roztyly is a Prague Metro station on Line C, located on the northern edge of Kunratický les in Prague 11. It was opened on 7 November 1980 as part of the extension from Kačerov to Kosmonautů (currently Háje).

The station was formerly known as Primátora Vacka after communist politician Václav Vacek.

Roztyly station is adjacent to a bus station served by intercity and international services.

References

Prague Metro stations
Railway stations opened in 1980
1980 establishments in Czechoslovakia
Railway stations in the Czech Republic opened in the 20th century